José Palafox Palafox (died 28 December 1628) was a Catholic prelate who served as Bishop of Jaca (1627–1628).

Biography
On 22 March 1627, during the papacy of Pope Urban VIII, José Palafox Palafox was appointed as Bishop of Jaca.  He served as Bishop of Jaca until his death on 28 December 1628.

References

17th-century Roman Catholic bishops in Spain
Bishops appointed by Pope Urban VIII
1628 deaths